Sarai Alamgir Tehsil is one of four administrative areas, or Tehsils, in the District of Gujrat. The Tehsil is located on the eastern bank of the Jhelum River across from the larger town of Jhelum. East of the Tehsil is the Upper Jhelum Canal.

Geography and climate
Sarai is located at  (32.900000, 73.750000) and lies at an altitude of 232 metres (763 ft) above sea-level.

The Tehsil as a whole has a moderate climate. In summer, temperatures can reach 45 °C, but the hot spells are comparatively short. The winter months are very pleasant with temperatures rarely falling below 2°C.

Location
Sarai Alamgir Tehsil is south of the city of Jhelum, Punjab, Pakistan.

History
The actual town of Sarai was founded by the Mughal emperor Aurangzeb because of its strategic location on the Grand Trunk Road and the Jhelum River as well as its proximity to Kashmir.
Sarai Alamgir was given status of Tehsil in 1993.

Administrative setup
The Tehsil Municipal Administration is a corporate body and consists of the Administrator, Tehsil Municipal Officer, 4 Tehsil Officers and other officials of the Local Council Service and officials of the offices entrusted to the Tehsil Municipal Administration. Administrator  is the head of Tehsil Municipal Administration and exercises all powers as have been assigned to him under the Ordinance. The Tehsil Municipal Officer is acting as coordinating and administrative officer in-charge of the Tehsil Officers.

Union Councils
Sarai Alamgir Tehsil has 9 union councils, They are (along with population as in 1998)

     Mandi Bhalwal (109)       18960
     Bhagnagar (113)           17282
     Karyala (113)             20531
     Simbli (114)              21936
     Khohar (115)              32486
     Sarai Alamgir-I (116)     17271
     Sarai Alamgir-II (117)    19895
     Thill Bakohal (110)       18574
     Baisa (111)               20353
     Total population          175,287 (as per Government of Punjab figures from 1998).

Transport

However, there are good transport links including a railway station, the Grand Trunk Road, the Jhelum River for travel by boat and the Upper Jhelum Canal.

Sites of interest nearby
Sarai Alamgir is situated on historic crossroads between the ancient Grand Trunk Road and the Jhelum River. Nearby are the Mangla Dam, the site of the Battle of the Hydaspes, the city of Alexandria Bucephalous founded by Alexander the Great, and the huge Rohtas Fort.

Related places
Sarai Alamgir Town
Gujrat District
Choa Rajgan

References

External links
http://www.shanegujrat.com/, Shan-e-Gujrat, an Urdu language newspaper, carries news about Sarai Alamgir Tehsil, Retrieved 10 Aug 2016
http://www.saraialamgir.net/, Sarai Alamgir social website, Retrieved 10 Aug 2016

Populated places in Gujrat District